BB Steal (Beg Borrow Steal) are a heavily Def Leppard-influenced Australian band formed circa 1987. Lead vocalist Craig Csongrady has been the only permanent member.

The band originally featured former Boss members lead vocalist Craig Csongrady and guitarist Kevin Pratt, as well as guitarist Warren Mason, bassist Peter Stanton, and drummer Peter Heckenberg.

BB Steal featured, during the course of 1991, drummer Craig Rosevear, who later went on to play with the Screaming Jets.

A later line-up of the band featured Csongrady, guitarist Shane Grahovac, guitarist Mark Lloyd, bassist Josh Biggs, and drummer Louis Halkias.

Def Leppard guitarist and Man Raze lead vocalist and guitarist Phil Collen produced the title song on their Heartbeat Away EP and co-produced their first full-length album On The Edge, which also features a version of the song "Heartbeat Away". There are reports that he also played some guitar and sang backing vocals on On The Edge, though he was never officially a member of the band.

BB Steal opened for Def Leppard during the Adrenalize Tour. First opening for Def Leppard on 11 July 1992 in Perth Australia.

Discography

Albums

Singles

References

Musical groups from Sydney
Australian rock music groups
Australian hard rock musical groups
Musical groups established in 1987